Leonid Vasilyevich  Markov (9 December 13, 1927 – March 1, 1991)  was a Russian actor.

Biography
Markov was born in the village Alekseevskoe (or Alexeevka) (now —  Akkol, Akmola Oblast, Kazakhstan).
In the years 1931-1934 he played children's roles in the Saratov Drama Theater, where his father —  actor Vasily Demyanovich  Markov.

In 1945, Leonid, together with his older sister, Rimma Markova, entered the studio of the Vologda Drama Theatre, where he studied until 1947.

At the end of the studio in 1951, Markov was admitted to the troupe of Lenin Komsomol, the scene of which debuted in 1947 as Nekhoda in the play  The Honor of His Youth.  Markov played Yasha and later Petya Trofimov in The Cherry Orchard by Anton Chekhov, Petrushin  in  The Living Corpse by Leo Tolstoy, and a number of other roles of the classical and contemporary repertoire.

In 1960, Markov moved to the Moscow theater, Pushkin where, in particular, he played Timofey in  Virgin Soil Upturned by Mikhail Sholokhov.

From 1966 to 1986 Markov served in the Moscow City Council Theatre, where he played a number of memorable roles, including Arbenin in Lermontov's Masquerade, Zvyagintsev in a dramatization of the novel Sholokhov's      They Fought for Their Country; and Porfiry Petrovitch in Petersburg Dreams  (the novel by Fyodor Dostoyevsky's Crime and Punishment). After a brief stint in 1986–1987 at the Maly Theater, where he played Antipas in the play Maxim Gorky The Zykovs,  Markov returned to the Moscow City Council Theatre.

Markov died on 2 March 1991 (March 1, according to other sources) in Moscow from cancer. He was buried on the main avenue of the Kuzminskoye Cemetery.

Selected filmography
 Strong with Spirit (1967) as German officer
 Russian field (1971) as  Avdyei Ugriumov
 Investigation Held by ZnaToKi (1973) as Bagrov
 The Garage (1979) as Professor Smirnovsky 
 Treasure Island (1982) as Billy Bones
 A Hunting Accident (1983) as Urbenin
 Mother Mary (1983) as Daniel Skobtsov
 Anna Pavlova (1983) as Nikolai Bezobrazov
 Snake Catcher (1985) as Pyotr Vasilievich Kotov

References

External links
 
  
 Leonid Markov   —  Actors of Soviet and Russian cinema 
  Чтобы помнили 
 Сайт Православного Свято-Тихоновского университета

1927 births
1991 deaths
Russian male film actors
Soviet male film actors
Honored Artists of the RSFSR
People's Artists of the USSR
Russian male stage actors
20th-century Russian male actors
Deaths from stomach cancer
Deaths from cancer in Russia
Soviet male stage actors